Tuxedos is the eighth EP by American indie rock band Cold War Kids. This was the follow up to their fourth studio album Dear Miss Lonelyhearts and was released digitally on September 17, 2013 by Downtown Records. On August 15, Cold War Kids announced that they were going to follow up Dear Miss Lonelyhearts by releasing a six-track EP on digital only. Besides the title track, the EP features an alternate version of "Bottled Affection", covers of Antony and the Johnsons ("Aeon") and The Band ("You Don't Come Through") and two previously unreleased tracks in the US ("Romance Languages #2" and "Pine St.").

To promote both efforts, the band went on a 32-city US headlining tour with support act Papa, ending in early November. The band further promoted their EP by shooting a music video for the track "Pine St." and premiered it on their record label's YouTube page on November 13, 2013.

Track listing

References

2013 EPs
Cold War Kids EPs
Downtown Records EPs
ITunes-exclusive releases